The 107th Battalion (Winnipeg), CEF, was an infantry battalion of the Great War Canadian Expeditionary Force.

History 
The 107th Battalion was authorized on 4 November 1915 and embarked for Britain on 19 September 1916. The battalion was converted to Pioneers and served in France and Flanders as the 107th Pioneer Battalion. The battalion disbanded on 15 September 1920.

The 107th Battalion recruited in, and was mobilized at, Winnipeg, Manitoba.

The 107th Battalion was commanded by Lt.-Col. G. Campbell, DSO, from 18 September 1916 to 9 October 1917 and Lt.-Col. H.G. Walkem from 9 October 1917 to 28 May 1918.

Battle Honours 
The 107th Battalion was awarded the following battle honours:
+
Vimy, 1917, 9–14 April 1917+
Arleux
Scarpe, 1917,3–4 May 1917
, 15–25 August 1917+
, 31 July–10 November 1917
Passchendaele, 12 October 1917 or 26 October–10 November 1917+

Perpetuation 
The 107th Battalion (Winnipeg), CEF, is not perpetuated by the Canadian Army.

See also 

 List of infantry battalions in the Canadian Expeditionary Force

References

Sources
Canadian Expeditionary Force 1914–1919 by Col. G.W.L. Nicholson, CD, Queen's Printer, Ottawa, Ontario, 1962

External links
The Canadian Encyclopedia - 107th Timber Wolf Battalion

107
Military units and formations of Manitoba